Shesh Yekan (also Romanized as Shesh Yekān; also known as Shashīgān) is a village in Fash Rural District, in the Central District of Kangavar County, Kermanshah Province, Iran. At the 2006 census, its population was 97, in 24 families.

References 

Populated places in Kangavar County